Sallustio Malatesta (c. 1450 - August 8, 1470) was an Italian noble. He was the son of Sigismondo Pandolfo Malatesta, lord of Rimini, and Isotta degli Atti. At first, Isotta was Sigismondo's mistress, but after the death of his wife Polissena Sforza, they would marry.

Isotta convinced Sigismondo to name him heir to Sigismondo's lordship, a choice also supported by Pope Paul II.

At Sigismondo's death in 1468, Isotta and Sallustio took control of his territory. Roberto Malatesta, an illegitimate son of Sigismondo, opposed his father's decisions. He would take control of Rimini with assistance from Milan, Florence, and Naples. In 1470, he would have Sallustio assassinated. Roberto would do the same to another of Sigismondo's sons, in November of the same year.

References

15th-century births
1470 deaths
15th-century Italian nobility
People from Rimini
House of Malatesta
Sigismondo Pandolfo Malatesta
Assassinated nobility
Assassinated Italian people